Crystal Lake is a lake in Burnsville, Dakota County, Minnesota. The lake is a primary source of recreation for the city of Burnsville and the surrounding area. Crystal Beach Park
, Crystal Lake West Park and Tyacke Park all have coastline along the lake and offer amenities such as boat landings, picnic areas, hard surfaced courts, playground equipment, walking trails, and others. Nearby Lac Lavon Lake Park has a softball complex, tennis courts, and horseshoe courts. The Lake also contains two islands, Picnic Island (nicknamed Potty Island) and Maple Island. The most southerly parts of the lake extend into the city of Lakeville.

Crystal Lake was named from its sparkling waters.

Wildlife 

According to the Minnesota DNR, abundant wildlife can get in the way of fishing. The lake has been found to contain the invasive Eurasian Watermilfoil plant species.

Despite the plant life, Bass and Sunfish are common throughout the lake. The DNR has plans to restock the lake with hybrid Muskies in even numbered years, but in the past few of legal size have been caught. Bluegills are also quite common.

References

Lakes of Dakota County, Minnesota
Crystal, Dakota County
Burnsville, Minnesota